Poirson is a French surname. Notable people with the surname include:

 Brune Poirson (born 1982), French politician 
 Charles-Gaspard Delestre-Poirson (1790–1859), French playwright and theatre director
 Louis Poirson (born 1962), Malagasy-French serial killer and rapist
 Victor-Armand Poirson (1858–1893), French illustrator and cartoonist

French-language surnames